Jacob Nagle (1761–1841) was an American and British soldier, sailor, and, above all, diarist who provides an exceptional first-hand account of many of the dramatic events of his lifetime.

Nagle was born in Reading, Pennsylvania, and fought in the American Revolutionary War along with his father. He was in the Battle of Brandywine and in George Washington's artillery at Valley Forge. He resigned from the Continental Army in 1778 and enlisted in the tiny Continental Navy.

He was captured by the British and taken to St. Kitts in the Caribbean in chains. He was freed when the French Navy captured the island in 1782 but was almost immediately arrested again for aiding British sailors. He was then taken to Martinique. From that point on, he served in the Royal Navy.

He sailed with the famous First Fleet expedition in 1787 as an able seaman on the expedition's naval escort Sirius. The expedition was charged with the task of founding the first British colony on the continent of Australia, in the territory of New South Wales.

Botany Bay, the First Fleet's designated destination in New South Wales, proved unsuitable for a colony, however, when the expedition landed there in the first month of the new year. The ships of the First Fleet subsequently moved up the New South Wales coastline, under the direction of Captain Arthur Phillip, soon finding refuge in a splendid harbour which would become known as Port Jackson.

Here, on 26 January 1788, Phillip officially founded the Colony of New South Wales, on the site of the future City of Sydney. This key historical event is marked annually in Australia by a public holiday and Australia Day celebrations.

Sirius subsequently acted as a re-supply vessel and communications link between New South Wales, the Pacific Ocean colony of Norfolk Island, and England. The ship was wrecked on a reef on Norfolk Island in 1790 during one of its replenishment missions. Nagle would spend a year on the island until he was eventually collected by a British vessel and returned to England, arriving there in 1792. He lived his version of the high life until press ganged aboard the Hector in that same year, serving on Hector until certain Bounty Mutineers were taken. In 1794, Nagle jumped to a new ship to go to Madras and Calcutta in India. In India, he linked with two women convicts who had escaped from Sydney and had set up a brothel.

In 1795, Nagle returned to England and married. He and his wife had seven children over the ensuing years. In 1802, a temporary peace was declared, and so he left the Navy and went to America to visit his family. He then entered the merchant marine, sometimes in American service and sometimes British. Nagle worked on shipping between Portugal and its colony in Brazil, basing himself in Lisbon where he lived from 1811 to 1821. He retired for good from the sea in 1824 shortly after his wife and all their children died of yellow fever.

His journal provides a vivid record of the major events and new territories of these decades, and he wrote his Memoirs late in his life.

See also
 First Fleet
 Journals of the First Fleet

References 

 
 Hill, David "1788, The Brutal Truth of the First Fleet, the biggest single overseas migration the world had ever seen" Random house Australia
 Frost, Alan. "Jacob Nagle" in Matthew, H.C.G. and Brian Harrison, eds. The Oxford Dictionary of National Biography. vol. 45, 108–109. London: OUP, 2004.
 Shy, John. "Benjamin Gilbert and Jacob Nagle: Soldiers of the American Revolution" in Nancy L. Rhoden and Ian I. Steele, eds. The Human Tradition in the American Revolution, 329–50. Wilmington, Delaware: Scholarly Resources, 2000. .

Further reading 
 Gillen, Mollie, The Founders of Australia: a biographical dictionary of the First Fleet, Sydney, Library of Australian History, 1989.

1761 births
1841 deaths
United States Navy personnel of the American Revolution
Continental Army soldiers
American diarists
British diarists
British memoirists
People of Pennsylvania in the American Revolution
American privateers
Royal Navy sailors
Writers from Reading, Pennsylvania
Deaths from yellow fever
First Fleet